Elutec (East London University Technical College) is a University Technical College located in Dagenham in the London Borough of Barking and Dagenham, England. The UTC opened in September 2014.

Pupils from Barking and Dagenham, Havering, Newham, Redbridge and Thurrock attend the UTC.

Sponsors
Elutec has three major sponsors:Ford Motor Company, the multi-national car manufacturer, University College London (UCL)  and CEME, the research, skills and business campus.

Campus
Facilities include a manufacturing line, robotics centre and hydraulic/pneumatic training suite.

Standards
A 2019 Ofsted report found that the school "requires improvement".

References

External links

University Technical Colleges in London
Secondary schools in the London Borough of Barking and Dagenham
Educational institutions established in 2014
2014 establishments in England
University College London
Dagenham